The Canton of Roquevaire is a former canton located within the Bouches-du-Rhône department of France. It had 46,105 inhabitants (2012). It was disbanded following the French canton reorganisation which came into effect in March 2015.

Elected to represent the canton in the General Council of Bouches-du-Rhône'' : 
 Francis Pellissier (PC, 2001-2008)

Area
It was composed of the communes Auriol, Belcodène, La Bouilladisse, Cadolive, La Destrousse, Gréasque, Peypin, Roquevaire and Saint-Savournin.

See also 
 Arrondissement of Marseille
 Cantons of the Bouches-du-Rhône department
 Communes of the Bouches-du-Rhône department

References

Roquevaire
2015 disestablishments in France
States and territories disestablished in 2015